Çərçiboğan (also, Charchibogan) is a village and municipality in the Sharur District of Nakhchivan Autonomous Republic, Azerbaijan. It is located 3 km in the south from the district center. Its population is busy with beet-growing, foddering and animal husbandry. There are secondary school, music school, library, club, cultural house and hospital in the village. It has a population of 3,374.

Etymology
The name of the Çərçiboğan is related with the name of the same named river. Hydronym was made out from components of çərçi (dealer) and boğan (stifle, drown verbs) means "the river which the dealer was drown".

References 

Populated places in Sharur District